Bindlach station is a railway station in the municipality of Bindlach, located in the district of Bayreuth in Upper Franconia, Germany.

References

Railway stations in Bavaria
Buildings and structures in Bayreuth (district)